Stephanie St. Clair (December 24, 1897 in Guadaloupe West Indies (French Caribbean)  – December 1969) was a prominent black woman of African descent and racketeer who ran numerous enterprises in Harlem, New York, in the early 20th century. St. Clair resisted the Mafia's interests for several years after Prohibition ended; she became a local legend for her public denunciations of corrupt police and for resisting Mafia control. She ran a successful numbers game in Harlem and was an activist for the black community. Her nicknames included: "Queenie," "Madame Queen," "Madame St. Clair" and "Queen of the Policy Rackets".

Early life
Stephanie St. Clair was born of African descent in the West Indies to a single mother, Félicienne, who worked hard to send her daughter to school. According to St. Clair's 1924 Declaration of Intention, she gave Moule Grandterre, French West Indies (present-day Guadeloupe, West Indies) as her place of birth, not Martinique as has usually been cited.

When St. Clair turned 15, her mother became very ill and she had to leave school. She managed to save some money and, after the death of her mother, finally left Guadeloupe for Montreal, likely coming as part of the 1910-1911 Caribbean Domestic Scheme, which brought domestic workers to Quebec.

She immigrated to the United States from Montreal, arriving in New York in 1912. She used the long voyage and subsequent quarantine to learn English. In Harlem she fell in love with a small-time crook, Duke, who soon tried to prostitute her but was shot in a fight between gangs. After four months, she decided to start her own business, selling controlled drugs with the help of her new boyfriend, Ed. Much of this speculation about St. Clair's early life is derived from a biographical novel, Madame St-Clair, Reine de Harlem, by Martinican author Raphaël Confiant (available in English translation as Madam St. Clair, Queen of Harlem).

After a few months, she had made $30,000 and told Ed she wanted to leave him and start her own business. Ed tried to strangle her and she pushed him away with such force that he cracked his skull against a table and died. For months afterwards, she employed her own men, bribed policemen, and on April 12, 1917, invested $10,000 of her own money in a clandestine lottery game in Harlem. As a result of her success running one of the leading numbers games in the city, she became known throughout Manhattan as "Queenie", but Harlem residents referred to her as "Madame St. Clair".

Numbers game involvement
St. Clair was involved in policy banking, which was a mixture of investing, gambling, and playing the lottery. Many banks at this time would not accept black customers, so they were not able to invest legally. Policy banking wasn't technically legal, but it was one of the few options offered to black Harlem residents who wished to invest their money. It was also a predominantly Black industry which allowed many bankers to have a sense of urgency that would not be possible in white-dominated fields. In this way, St. Clair used the underground economy in Harlem to address race politics. 

At this time, the numbers game in Harlem was male-dominated and St. Clair was one of the only women involved. She helped the black community in Harlem by providing many with jobs such as numbers runners. She also helped her community by donating money to programs that promoted racial progress. Because of her success in the numbers game, she lived a lavish life making over $20,000 a year in the 1920s.

Police corruption
St. Clair was known to put out ads in the local newspapers educating the Harlem community about their legal rights, advocating for voting rights, and calling out police brutality against the black community. Several times she complained to local authorities about harassment by the police. When they paid no heed, she ran advertisements in Harlem newspapers, accusing senior police officers of corruption.

The police responded by arresting her on a trumped-up charge and she spent eight months in a workhouse. In response, she testified to the Seabury Commission about the kickbacks she had paid police officers and those who had participated in the Harlem numbers game. The Commission subsequently fired more than a dozen police officers.

Conflict with the Mafia
After the end of Prohibition, Jewish and Italian-American crime families saw a decrease in profits and decided to move in on the Harlem gambling scene. Bronx-based mob boss Dutch Schultz was the first to move in, beating and killing numbers operators who would not pay him protection.

St. Clair and her chief enforcer Ellsworth "Bumpy" Johnson refused to pay protection to Schultz, despite the violence and intimidation by police they faced. St. Clair responded by attacking the storefronts of businesses that ran Dutch Schultz's betting operations and tipping off the police about him. This resulted in the police raiding his house, arresting more than a dozen of his employees and seizing approximately $12 million (about $190.6 million in 2021 currency). St. Clair never submitted to Dutch Schultz, unlike many others in Harlem.

After St. Clair's struggles with Schultz, she had to become legitimate and stay away from the police, so she passed on her criminal business to "Bumpy" Johnson. Eventually her former enforcer negotiated with Lucky Luciano, and Lucky took over Schultz's spots, with a percentage going to "Bumpy". The Italians then had to go to "Bumpy" first if they had any problems in Harlem.
Luciano realized that the struggle with the Five Families was hurting their business, so Schultz was assassinated in 1935 on the orders of The Commission. Although St. Clair was not involved with his murder, she was remembered for sending an infamous telegram to his bed that stated “As ye sow, so shall ye reap.” The telegram reportedly made headlines across the nation. By the 1940s, "Bumpy" Johnson had become the reigning king in Harlem, while St. Clair became less and less involved in the numbers game.

Later life

After St. Clair retired from the numbers game, she started a new era of her life as an advocate for political reform. In the late 1930s, she met her husband, Sufi Abdul Hamid, known as the "Black Hitler" for his anti-Semitic, Nazi-fashion of activism. Hamid was a militant activist and was the leader of an Islamic Buddhist cult. St. Clair and Hamid's marriage went downhill quickly when he allegedly had an affair with a black fortune teller known as "Fu Futtam" (Hamid went on to marry Futtam, whose real name was Dorothy Matthews, in April 1938, and they founded a Buddhist temple together).

The marriage officially ended in January 1938 when St. Clair shot Hamid during a fight over his relationship with Futtam and was sentenced to two to ten years at the Bedford Hills Correctional Facility for Women in New York. After she was released from prison in the early 1940s, St. Clair lived a secluded life and was reported as having successfully transitioned from underworld figure to a legitimate “prosperous business woman.” She continued to write columns in the local newspaper about discrimination, police brutality, illegal search raids, and other issues facing the Black community.

Death
St. Clair died quietly and still wealthy in 1969, shortly before her 73rd birthday. "Bumpy" Johnson, who had come back to live with her and to write poetry, had died one year earlier. However, her purported death was not mentioned in any newspaper of the era.

In popular culture

Film

In the 1984 film The Cotton Club, St. Clair is played by Novella Nelson 
In the 1997 film Hoodlum, St. Clair is played by Cicely Tyson

Television

 St. Clair is portrayed by Alexandra Afryea in a 2014 episode of the TV One series Celebrity Crime Files

 A character named Queeny with a narrative  similar to St. Clair was in the CBC/BET series "The Porter". 2022

Theater

 Fulani Haynes played St. Clair in a 2007 production of 409 Edgecombe Ave, The House on Sugar Hill by Katherine Butler Jones

Comic books

 The 2022 comic book series Harlem by Mikaël centers on St. Clair's numbers game racket in the 1930s
 The 2021 graphic novel Queenie, la marraine de Harlem (Queenie: Godmother of Harlem) by Elizabeth Colomba and Aurélie Lévy

Video Games
 She appears as a playable character in the strategy game Empire of Sin

References

External links
 CourtTV's CrimeLibrary - Harlem Gangs from the 1920s and 1930s
 Harlem Godfather - The Rap on my Husband, Ellsworth "Bumpy" Johnson
 
 - Podcast - No Man's Land Queenie episode

19th-century births
1969 deaths
Prohibition-era gangsters
People with acquired American citizenship
American gangsters
American female organized crime figures
American crime bosses
Numbers game
Emigrants from the French West Indies to the United States